John Michael Frederick Castle (born 14 January 1940) is an English actor. He is best known for his film and television work, most notably playing Bill in Michelangelo Antonioni's Blowup (1966) and Geoffrey in The Lion in Winter (1968). His other significant credits include Man of La Mancha (1972) and RoboCop 3 (1993).

Early life
Born in Croydon, Castle was educated at Brighton College and Trinity College, Dublin, and trained at the Royal Academy of Dramatic Art (RADA).

Work
Castle's first appearance was as Westmoreland on stage in Henry V  on 5 June 1964, at the Open Air Theatre, Regent's Park. He was 24 years old. His first Broadway theatre appearance was in February 1970 as "Jos" in the short-lived musical Georgy.

His screen debut was in Michelangelo Antonioni's 1966 film Blowup playing David Hemmings' artist friend, Bill. In 1968, he portrayed the plotting Prince Geoffrey in the film adaptation of The Lion in Winter, starring Peter O'Toole and Katharine Hepburn. According to Rotten Tomatoes, The Lion in Winter is Castle's "highest-rated" film. Also in 1967, he appeared in the British TV series The Prisoner as Number 12, a sympathetic guardian in the episode, entitled "The General".
Castle also played the role of Octavius Caesar in Charlton Heston's film version of Antony and Cleopatra (1972), as well as the role of Postumus Agrippa in the 1976 BBC series I, Claudius.

Castle made two appearances in the hard-hitting police drama The Professionals. In his first appearance he played CI5 Officer Tommy McKay in the episode "Heroes," whilst his subsequent appearance saw him in the role of Peter Crabbe, an underworld hitman in the episode "Man Without a Past."

Castle appeared as Carruthers, the most honourable of a trio of schemers in an episode of Granada Television's series Sherlock Holmes ("The Solitary Cyclist", 1984). His association with Sherlock Holmes continued with his role as Nigel St Clair in the film version of The Crucifer of Blood (1991).

He played Inspector Craddock in an adaptation of the Agatha Christie story "A Murder is Announced" (1985), a role he recreated in the Miss Marple mystery The Mirror Crack'd from Side to Side (1992). He also played the title role in the 2000 made-for-TV version of Christie's Lord Edgware Dies. In 1990 Castle starred as Superintendent George Thorne in the BBC's radio adaptations of John Penn's novels. Castle appeared in other TV series, including Ben Hall and Lost Empires.

Among Castle's stage performances was his role as Oswald in the Royal Shakespeare Company's revival of Ibsen's Ghosts in 1967. He played the title character in the play Gandhi at the Tricycle Theatre London.

Personal life
Castle is married to writer Maggie Wadey.

Selected filmography

Film
 Blowup (1966) – Bill
 The Lion in Winter (1968) – Geoffrey
 The Promise (1969) – Marat Yestigneyev
 Antony and Cleopatra (1972) – Octavius Caesar
 Made (1972) – Father Dyson
 Man of La Mancha (1972) – Sanson Carrasco / The Duke
 The Incredible Sarah (1976) – Damala
 Eliza Fraser (1976) – Captain Rory McBride
 Eagle's Wing (1979) – The Priest
 Never Never Land (1980) – Jim
 King David (1985) – Abner
 Dealers (1989) – Frank Mallory
 RoboCop 3 (1993) – Paul McDaggett
 Sparrow (1993) – Giuseppe
 Little Lord Fauntleroy  (1995) – Mr. Havisham
 Merisairas (1996) – Chief Engineer Josif Mantz
 Gods and Generals (2003) – Brig. Gen. William N. Pendleton
 I Against I (2012) – Tommy Carmichael

Television

 The Prisoner (1967) – Number Twelve in the episode "The General" 
 The Shadow of the Tower (1972) – Thomas Flamank
 Softly, Softly (1973) – Billy Mason
 Ben Hall (TV series) (1975, ABC, BBC, 20th Century Fox) – Frank Gardiner
 Warship (1975) – Lieutenant-Commander Peter Tremayne, officer commanding the Royal Navy submarine HMS Ovid in the episode "Under the Surface"
 I, Claudius (1976) – Agrippa Postumus
 The New Avengers (1976) – Colonel Miller in the episode "Dirtier by the dozen"
 The Three Hostages (1977) – Dominick Medina
 1990 (1977) – Philip Carter
 The Prime of Miss Jean Brodie (1978) – Teddy Lloyd
 Lillie (1978) – Prince Louis of Battenberg
 The Professionals (1978) — CI5 Agent Tommy McKay ('Shotgun Tommy') in A05 "Heroes"; Peter Crabbe in B04 "Man Without a Past"
 Tales of the Unexpected - "Fat Chance" (1980) - John Burge
 Strangers (1982) – Martin Hargreaves
 Reilly, Ace of Spies (1983) – Count Massino
 The Adventures of Sherlock Holmes "The Solitary Cyclist" (1984) - Carruthers
 Miss Marple Series 1 Episode 1: "A Murder is Announced" (1985) – Detective Inspector Craddock
 Lost Empires with Laurence Olivier and Colin Firth (1986)
 Tales of the Unexpected
 The Crucifer of Blood (1991) – Neville St Clair
 Inspector Morse Series 5 Episode 3: "Who Killed Harry Field?" (1991) – Tony Doyle
 Miss Marple  "The Mirror Crack'd from Side to Side" (1992) – Detective Inspector Craddock
 Lovejoy (1994) Series 6, Episode 2: Day of Reckoning – Max Hunter
 Bramwell  (1994) - Guy Le Saux
 Pie in the Sky (1996) – Charles Rider
 The Ruth Rendell Mysteries (1997) – Mark in the episode "A Dark Blue Perfume"
 Catherine Cookson's A Dinner of Herbs (2000) - Alfred Cottle
 Agatha Christie's Poirot Season 8 Episode 2: "Lord Edgware Dies" (2000) – Lord Edgware
 Nova (2000, Public Broadcasting Service) – David Irving
 Casualty (2004) – Brian 'Bullet' Taylor
 The Princes in The Tower (2005, Channel 4 production) – Dr John Argentine
 Spooks (2006) – Jocelyn Myers
 Midsomer Murders Series 10 Episode 3: King's Crystal (2007) – Charles King
 A Touch of Frost (2008) Mind Games - Charlie Collingham
 The Tractate Middoth (2013, BBC) – John Eldred

References

 Who's Who in the Theatre, 17th ed, 1981

External links
 

1940 births
Living people
English male film actors
English male television actors
Alumni of RADA
Alumni of Trinity College Dublin
People educated at Brighton College
People from Croydon